A chalcogen bond (ChB) is an attractive interaction in the family of σ-hole interactions, along with halogen bonds. Electrostatic, charge-transfer (CT) and dispersion terms have been identified as contributing to this type of interaction. In terms of CT contribution, this family of attractive interactions has been modeled as an electron donor (the bond acceptor)) interacting with the σ* orbital of a C-X bond (X= hydrogen, halogen, chalcogen, pnictogen, etc.) of the bond donor. In terms of electrostatic interactions, the molecular electrostatic potential (MEP) maps  is often invoked to visualize the electron density of the donor and an electrophilic region on the acceptor, where the potential is depleted,  referred to as a σ-hole. ChBs, much like hydrogen and halogen bonds, have been invoked in various non-covalent interactions, such as protein folding, crystal engineering, self-assembly, catalysis, transport, sensing, templation, and drug design.

Bonding

Origin 
Chalcogen bonding is comparable to other forms of σ-hole interactions. However, the specific contributions to this interaction are still a matter of debate. The contributing forces can be broken down into dispersion/van der Waals interactions, electrostatic interactions, and orbital mixing (CT) interactions. These contributing attractive forces are invoked to explain the differences in bonding strength associated with different donor-acceptor pairs. Some authors argue that electrostatic interactions dominate only in the case of harder chalcogen atoms as acceptors, specifically O and S. The chalcogen bonding of heavier group 16 congeners are thought to be attributable more to dispersion forces. In a separate camp, these contributions are considered minor compared to the orbital mixing/delocalization between the donor n orbital and acceptor σ* orbital.

Given the dual ability of chalcogens to serve as donor and acceptor molecules for σ-hole interactions, a geometric schematic has been generated to distinguish between the differing bonding character. The σ* orbital is exactly opposite the σ bonds to a chalcogen bond. It is the region between the σ-holes in which the lone pairs localize in a donor region. These regions have been referred to as the nucleophilic gate, the σ-hole regions which are electron depleted, and the electrophilic gate, the donor region which is electron enriched.

Evaluation

AIM 
Any electron donor can donate electrons into the σ-hole of a bonded chalcogen, including halogen anions, amines, and π electrons (such as benzene). Similar to halogen bonding, chalcogen bonding can occur between two chalcogens, resulting in a chalcogen-chalcogen bond. Non-covalent interactions are well characterized by Bader's atoms in molecules (AIM) model which defines a bond as any bond-critical point (BCP) existing between two nuclei. This can be understood simply as a saddle point on an electron density map of a molecule. Hydrogen and halogen bonds are both well characterized by this method. The same analysis has been performed on chalcogen bonds, as shown below. The BCP's between S and Cl− in these molecules are evidence of the non-covalent interactions, in this case chalcogen-halogen bonds.

NBO 
Another method used to evaluate chalcogen bonding specifically and a wide range of bonding generally is natural bond orbital (NBO) analysis. NBO analysis distinguishes between covalent, Lewis-type bonding interactions and non-covalent, non-Lewis bonding interaction. The chalcogen bond will be evaluated based on the natural population of the n → σ* orbital. A higher population of this orbital should then also be reflected in changes in the geometry.

Geometry 
Both electrostatic mapping and molecular orbital explanation for chalcogen bonding result in a predicted directionality for the bonding interaction. In a hydrogen or halogen bond, the electrophilic region/σ* orbital are located opposite the σ bond, forming a single σ-hole. Optimal hydrogen or halogen bonds thus are linear in geometry. Chalcogen bonding is a result of the same interaction. However, it is possible for chalcogens to form multiple sigma bonds and thus multiple σ-holes to form such bonding interactions. Evaluations of x-ray crystal structures or structure determinations based on vibrational spectroscopy can provide evidence for chalcogen bonding based on proximity and orientation of atoms. Surveys of the Cambridge Structural Database have revealed a high frequency of likely chalcogen bonding interactions in protein structures and solid state crystals of molecules.

H-bonding vs. chalcogen bonding 
Due to a chalcogen's ability to function as an electron donor, many systems will balance between hydrogen bonding with the chalcogen as a donor or chalcogen bonding. This balance can be observed in a series of self-bonding intermolecular interactions between various substituted chalcogens. In cases with hard chalcogen atoms as acceptors, the balance favors H-bonding between chalcogen and methyl H. However, as the acceptor atoms move down the group, chalcogen-chalcogen bonding will be favored. It is hypothesized that electrostatic forces should only dominate in a chalcogen-chalcogen bond with lighter congeners, and instead that dispersion forces dominate in the cases of heavier congeners

A means of comparing the chalcogen-chalcogen bonding forces with H-bonding is to compare the effect of various solvent environments on the chalcogen-chalcogen bond. This has been done on a series of molecules featuring a chalcogen-chalcogen intramolecular bond in one conformation (closed) and exposed to solvent interactions in another (open). One such study found that the preference for the closed conformation showed almost no dependence on the solvent environment. This was taken to mean that changes in solvent dipole moment, polarizability, or H-bonding character did not influence the balance between chalcogen-chalcogen bonding and solvent interactions. Such a conclusion would mean that the dispersion forces and electrostatic forces involved in chalcogen-chalcogen bonding do not majorly influence the interaction. Instead, this would mean that the orbital interaction dominates the bonding interaction.

Applications 
A wide range of applications have been proposed for designing chalcogen bonds into systems where weak interactions are crucial. This can include areas dependent on specific recognition or molecules, sort of a lock and key model, as seen in drug design, sensing, and highly selective catalysis. Additional applications are in solid-state and materials science where particular packing of molecules can dramatically impact bulk properties.

Drug Design 
Drug design is a broad umbrella which includes molecular design to vary biologically relevant characteristics. With regard to weak interactions, the design is aimed at tuning ligand docking/binding of drugs to biologically relevant molecules or proteins and associated biological effects from various binding modes. The weak interaction dictating the specific binding can be interatomic between the target and drug, or they can be intramolecular in the drug itself, typically affecting a conformational preference. There are very few examples known of intermolecular chalcogen bonding between a drug and its target. However, clear conformational preferences have been shown in drug molecules which are attributed to the stabilization from chalcogen bonding interactions. These are most typically involving chalcogen heterocycles as chalcogen bond acceptors.

The conformational preference can be derived from various classes of intramolecular chalcogen bonding, including 1,4, 1,5, and 1,6 O•••S interactions, 1,4 and 1,5 N•••S interactions, and S•••aromatic interactions. Each class of these interactions is made up of large classes of drugs in which chalcogen bonding has resulted in up to a 1500 fold difference in potency of some compounds. It is hypothesized that intramolecular chalcogen bonding out competes intermolecular interactions since divalent sulfur will direct σ* orbitals at angles flanking the molecule rather than directly outward as is seen in halogen bonding.

Catalysis 
Chalcogen bonding in catalysis has been used to pre-orient substrate, allowing for asymmetric/stereoselective catalysis on the preferred conformation of the substrate. Examples include an asymmetric acyl transfer on an enantiomeric mixture catalyzed by a chiral isothiourea. The acyl group is first transfer on to the chiral catalyst which is purported to go through a transition state featuring a 1,5 chalcogen bonding interaction on the catalyst which orients the acyl group prior to transfer on to the substrate. This resulted in one enantiomer of the substrate acylated and the remaining substrate enriched in the other enantiomer. Similar interactions have been invoked in stereoselective Michael additions and β-lactonizations.

References 

Chemical bonding